Herbelles is a former commune in the Pas-de-Calais department in the Hauts-de-France region of France. On 1 September 2016, it was merged into the new commune Bellinghem, of which it became a delegated commune.

Geography
A small village situated 5 miles (8 km) south of Saint-Omer, at the D192 and D201 crossroads.

Population

Places of interest
 The church of St. Leger, dating from the seventeenth century.
 Two 17th century farm houses.

See also
 Communes of the Pas-de-Calais department

References

Former communes of Pas-de-Calais